HMS Newcastle was a 50-gun fourth rate ship of the line of the Royal Navy, built by Peirson Lock at Portsmouth Dockyard and launched in 1750 for active service during the Seven Years' War against France. Principally engaged in defending British settlements in India, she was wrecked in a storm off Pondicherry in January 1761.

Fate
On 1 January 1761, a cyclone off Pondicherry, drove Newcastle, and  onshore, where they wrecked. Newcastle was able to leave harbour, but the wind shifted, impeding her and eventually driving her ashore two miles south of Pondicherry. They tried to get out to open water, but were unable to. When they anchored the sea overwhelmed them and they both foundered, each with the loss of almost all on board. The former Captain, Sir Digby Dent, survived, having transferred command to Captain Richard Collins exactly one year before. Collins also survived the wreck.

Notes

References

Lavery, Brian (2003) The Ship of the Line – Volume 1: The development of the battlefleet 1650–1850. Conway Maritime Press. .

Ships of the line of the Royal Navy
1750 ships
Maritime incidents in 1761